Czesław Jóźwiak (7 September 1919 – 24 August 1942) was a Polish Roman Catholic anti-Nazi resistance fighter. As leader of the Poznań Five, he held a leadership role in the Volunteer Army of the Western Territories resistance group. Arrested, tortured, and eventually guillotined by the Nazis, he was beatified by Pope John Paul II in 1999 as one of the 108 Blessed Polish Martyrs of World War II.

References 

1919 births
1942 deaths
108 Blessed Polish Martyrs
Polish people executed by Nazi Germany
People executed by Nazi Germany by guillotine
Polish resistance members of World War II